Supply depots are a type of military installation used by militaries to store battlefield supplies temporarily on or near the front lines until they can be distributed to military units. Supply depots are responsible for nearly all other types of materiel, except ammunition.

Supply depots are usually run by a logistics officer who is responsible for allocating supplies as necessary to units who request them.

Due to their vulnerability, supply depots are often the targets of enemy raids. In more modern times, depots have been targeted by long range artillery, long-range missiles, and bomber aircraft, due to the advantage that disrupted logistics can give to a belligerent force.

Types of supply depots include base, station, forward, and reserve supply depots.

See also
Royal Army Ordnance Corps
Ammunition dump
Military logistics
Military supply chain management
Supply chain

Military logistics
Military installations